Michael Doyle (1889–1970) was an Irish hurler who played as a full-forward for the Kilkenny senior team.

Born in Mooncoin, County Kilkenny, Doyle first arrived on the inter-county scene at the age of eighteen when he made his senior debut in the 1907 championship. Doyle went on to play a key part for Kilkenny during the team's first golden age, and won five All-Ireland medals and six Leinster medals. He was an All-Ireland runner-up on one occasion.

At club level Doyle won six championship medals with Mooncoin.

Doyle's brothers, Eddie and Eddie Doyle, also had All-Ireland successes with Kilkenny.

References

1889 births
1970 deaths
Mooncoin hurlers
Kilkenny inter-county hurlers
Leinster inter-provincial hurlers
All-Ireland Senior Hurling Championship winners